The Texas Ethics Commission was established in 1991 to "provide guidance on various public ethics laws" within the state of Texas. The agency is headquartered on the 10th Floor of the Sam Houston State Office Building at 201 East 14th Street in Downtown Austin.

The Commission was created by a state constitutional amendment voted on by the voters on November 5, 1991, Article III, Section 24a, and assumed the duties of the Texas Ethics Advisory Commission.

The Commission consists of eight members. Legislators are excluded from serving. Four members are appointed by the Governor, two by the Lt. Governor, and two by the Speaker of the House. Appointees must be selected equally from lists recommended by the Republican and Democratic members in the Texas House and Senate. By the constitution, the ethics commission recommends the salaries and per diem of members of the Texas Legislature, the Lieutenant Governor, and the Speaker of the Texas House of Representatives.

The legislature has also given the commission various other duties, including the filing of financial disclosure statements for government officials and the filing of campaign finance regulatory statements by candidates and citizens who engage in political speech related to campaigns and elections.

The Texas Ethics Commission is currently chaired by Chase Untermeyer, a Republican appointed to the Commission by Texas House Speaker Joe Straus.

See also

Nevada Commission on Ethics
New Mexico State Ethics Commission
Oklahoma Ethics Commission
Pennsylvania State Ethics Commission
Wisconsin Ethics Commission

References

External links
 
 Handbook of Texas Online

Ethics Commission, Texas
Politics of Texas
Ethics commissions
1991 establishments in Texas
Government agencies established in 1991